Tancrémont is a hamlet of Wallonia split between the municipalities of Pepinster and Theux, located in the province of Liège, Belgium. 

The north side of 666 National Road that crosses the hamlet is part of the municipality of Pepinster.

Cuisine 
Tancrémont is known for the quality of its large cakes called "roues de charrette" (cartwheels, with a diameter of about ) and particularly for the rice cakes. These cakes are sold or consumed in the local bakeries.

Gallery

See also 
 Fort de Tancrémont 
 Shrine of Tancrémont

References

External links

Populated places in Liège Province
Pepinster
Theux